Fast on the Draw is a 1950 American western film directed by Thomas Carr.

Plot

Cast

External links

Fast on the Draw at BFI

1950 films
American Western (genre) films
1950 Western (genre) films
Films directed by Thomas Carr
Lippert Pictures films
American black-and-white films
1950s English-language films
1950s American films